Edmon may refer to:

Arthur Edmon Brown, Jr., United States Army four-star general, Vice Chief of Staff of the United States Army (VCSA) from 1987 to 1989
Edmon Colomer, Spanish conductor from Barcelona
Isidore Louis Bernard Edmon van Dommelen, known as Lou Tellegen (1881–1934), Dutch-born stage and film actor, film director and screenwriter
Edmon Low (1902–1983), the head librarian of the Oklahoma State University Library from 1940 to 1967
Edmon Marukyan, Armenian lawyer, Member of National Assembly, elected three times
Edmon López Möller, (born 1996), professional squash player who represents Spain
Edmon Ryan (1905–1984), American theatre, film, and television actor
Edmon Shehadeh, Palestinian poet and literary

See also
Edmon Low Library (ELL), the main library of the Oklahoma State University System